Marine mucilage, also referenced as sea snot or sea saliva, is thick, gelatinous organic matter found around the world's oceans, lately observed in the Mediterranean Sea. 

Marine mucilage carries diverse microorganisms. Triggers that cause it to form include increased phosphorus, drought conditions, and climate change. Its effects are widespread, affecting fishing industries, smothering sea life, and spreading bacteria and viruses. Citizens and governments around the world are working to institute countermeasures, including treatment, seawater cleanup, and other public policies.

Composition 
Marine mucilage has many components, including diverse microorganisms including viruses and prokaryotes, debris, proteins, minerals,and exopolymeric compounds with colloidal properties. Although various historical definitions have not consolidated, it is agreed that mucilages are complex chemical substances, as well as complex natural materials. Its composition can change over time.

Causes 
Marine mucilage appears following an increase of phosphorus. In one 2021 case phosphorus values were three to four times higher than the previous year. Other excess nutrients combined with drought conditions and prolonged warm sea temperatures and calm weather contributed. Marine mucilage is also produced by phytoplankton when they are stressed.

Anthropogenic global climate change is likely increasing marine mucilage. Warmer, slower moving waters increase production and allow it to accumulate in massive sheets. In the Mediterranean Sea, the frequency of marine mucilage events increases with warm temperature anomalies.

History 
Marine mucilage was first reported in 1729.
The Deepwater Horizon oil spill in the Gulf of Mexico created large amounts of marine mucilage. Scientists are not sure of the mechanism for this, but one theory asserts that a massive kill of microscopic marine life created a "blizzard" of marine snow. Scientists worry that the mass of marine mucilage could pose a biohazard to surviving marine life in the area.  Marine mucilage left by the spill likely resulted in the loss of sea life in the Gulf, as evidenced by a dead field of deepwater coral 11 kilometers from the Deepwater Horizon station.
The Mediterranean experienced the worse effects of marine mucilage in 2021. Exponential growth afflicted the Mediterranean and other seas. In early 2021, marine mucilage spread in the Sea of Marmara, due to pollution from wastewater dumped into seawater, which led to the proliferation of phytoplankton, and threatened the marine biome. The port of Erdek at the Sea of Marmara was covered by mucilage. Turkish workers embarked on a massive effort to vacuum it up in June 2021. Yalıköy port in Ordu Province witnessed accumulating mucilage in June 2021, in the Black Sea. Fines were issued to companies discovered to be dumping wastewater.

Effects 
Increasing marine mucilage has become an issue in public health, economic, and environmental matters. Excessive marine mucilage was observed as early as 2009.

Public Health 
While marine mucilage is not toxic to humans, public health concerns are associated with it. Due to its complex makeup, marine mucilage contains pathogenic bacteria and transports marine diseases.  The majority of such diseases affect both marine invertebrates and vertebrates.

Economic 
Marine mucilage has had an impact on economies around the world, especially those that revolve around the Mediterranean. Marine mucilage has long been seen as a nuisance to the fishing industry, as it clogs fishing nets. Coastal towns that rely on tourism suffer from unappealing waters. Marine mucilage produce an offensive smell and makes the ocean unsuitable for bathing.

Environmental 
Marine mucilage can coat the gills of sea creatures subsumed in it, cutting off oxygen and killing them. Marine mucilage floating on the surface also can significantly limit sunlight that nourishes coral and vegetation.

Countermeasures 
Countermeasures include collecting marine mucilage from the sea surface and laying barriers on the sea surface to prevent it from spreading. Long-term countermeasures include improving wastewater treatment, creating marine protected areas, and limiting climate change. Another approach involves attracting activity such as tourism that prevents the water from stagnating for long periods. Introducing marine species that can consume excessive nutrients.

See also

References 

Aquatic ecology
Biological oceanography
Wikipedia Student Program